Mugaritz is a well-known restaurant in Rentería, Guipúzcoa (Spain), which opened in March 1998 under the management of Chef Andoni Aduriz. It is considered one of the world's best restaurants since 2006 according to Restaurant Magazine and has been recently been ranked fourth in this toplist.

History 
The restaurant is recognized by the press as "the most important gastronomic phenomenon of the world in recent times". Both Mugaritz and Andoni Luis Aduriz frequently show up on pages of media like "Omnivore", "Le Figaro" in France, "Brutus", "Cuisine Kingdom" in Japan, "The Trade" and "Republic" in Latin America and the U.S. "Time" or "The Observer ". Mugaritz earned his first Michelin star in 2000 and, five years later, in 2005, the Michelin Guide awarded him a second one. The restaurant has also the highest rating by the Repsol Guide, the Three “Soles” and a multitude of honors for his innovative and creative activity in gastronomy.

Fire 
On the morning of February 15, 2010 a short circuit caused a serious fire in Mugaritz's kitchen, so the restaurant was closed for four months. After the fire, the team received thousands of expressions of solidarity from around the world, which gave them strength to go ahead with the project.

Books 

 La joven cocina vasca (1996). Ixo editorial
 El mercado en el plato (1998). Ixo editorial
 Tabula Huevo (2000). Ixo editorial
 Foie Gras (2002). Ixo editorial
 Tabula Bacalao (2003). Montagud editores
 Clorofilia (2004). Ixo editorial
 Txikichef (2006). Hariadna editorial. 
 Bestiarium Gastronomicae (2006). Ixo editorial
 Tabula 35 mm (2007). Ixo editorial
Diccionario Botánico para Cocineros (2007). Ixo editorial
La botánica del deseo (2008). Prólogo de la edición en castellano del libro de Michael Pollan.
 Las primeras palabras de la cocina (2009). Ixo editorial
 Los Bajos de la Alta Cocina (2009). Ixo editorial
 El Dilema del Omnívoro (2011). Prólogo de la edición en castellano del libro de Michael Pollan.
 El Gourmet Extraterrestre (2011). Editorial Planeta.
 Larousse Gastronomique (2011). Editorial Larousse. Edición revisada y prologada por A. Luis Aduriz. 
 Innovación abierta y alta cocina (2011). Ediciones Pirámide
 Mugaritz - A Natural Science of Cooking - (2012). Editorial Phaidon Press / RBA / Kosmos
 Cocinar, comer, convivir (2012). Ediciones Destino.
 Mugaritz. La cocina como ciencia natural (2012). RBA
 Mugaritz BSO (2012). Ixo producciones

References

External links

Official website
Luciana Bianchi, Top chefs dining at Mugaritz
The Restaurant Seeker, The restaurant Seeker at Mugaritz
 Mugaritz.com
 Mugaritzak - Mugaritz Blog 
 Facebook
 Mugaritz YouTube

Michelin Guide starred restaurants in Spain
Basque cuisine
Spanish cuisine
Buildings and structures in Gipuzkoa
Restaurants established in 1998